QIT may refer to:

 QIT-Fer et Titane, a Canadian mining company
 Quadrupole ion trap
 Quantum information theory
 Queensland University of Technology
 Q = It, the formula describing charge in terms of current and time